Bodger & Badger is a BBC children's comedy programme written by Andy Cunningham, first broadcast in 1989. It starred Cunningham as handyman Simon Bodger and his talking badger companion. The programme was spawned from some appearances the double act made in 1988 as part of the Saturday morning BBC1 children's programme On the Waterfront.

Plot
The programme followed the exploits of Simon Bodger and his puppet companion, Badger, a badly-behaved badger with a proclivity for mashed potato. The first four series focused on Bodger's jobs as a handyman and his attempts to hide Badger from his superiors. Series 1 was set at Troff's Nosherama, a café where Bodger worked as a cook. Series 2 and 3 were set at Letsby Avenue Junior School. Series 4 was set at Chessington World of Adventures, a real theme park in Surrey.

From series 5, the character Mousey was introduced, a puppeted mouse with a fondness for cheese. The show was now set at Bodger's rented home and later his B&B hotel. Series 5-7 rarely mentioned Bodger's employment, suggesting he was now unemployed. The later series still focused on Bodger's attempts to hide Badger from figures of authority, his landlady from Series 5-7 and the tourist information officer in series 9. These later episodes increased the slapstick humour with prominent comic sound effects and incidental music.

Theme song

The programme had a memorable theme song sung by children. The music was composed by Peter Gosling and the lyrics written by Andy Cunningham. Various edits of the song were used over the years, with the full version used on the end credits of some episodes from 1989 to 1991.

Characters and cast

Main characters

Simon Bodger (Andy Cunningham) - Simon Bodger is a handyman who has had various jobs throughout the series. However he is of a nervous disposition which causes him to be clumsy, make silly mistakes (including many misunderstandings) and from the trouble that comes from Badger's antics, he repeatedly keeps getting sacked. In the first series he was working as a cook for Troff's Nosherama. He got sacked after Badger accidentally revealed himself to praise Mr Troff for giving Simon the job of chef. In the second and third series he was a caretaker at the Letsby Avenue Junior School. This is not far from Troffs' Nosherama, as the Letsby Avenue football team are referenced in the first episode of series one. In the fourth series he was a handyman and zookeeper at Chessington World of Adventures. In the fifth, sixth and seventh series he was seemingly unemployed and renting a flat, occasionally working as a casual handyman to his landlady, Mrs Dribelle. In the eighth and ninth series he was temporary manager of a Bed and Breakfast while a relative who owned it went on a round-the-world trip. All businesses Bodger worked for are, of course, fictional. Badger is his anthropomorphic talking pet and best friend, although all the trouble that Bodger ends up in is usually down to Badger. Regular gags usually involve Badger covering Bodger in mashed potato or some other messy substance, either intentionally or accidentally.
Badger (voiced by Andy Cunningham, operated by Andy Cunningham + others) - Badger is named after what he is - a badger (although he often responds to being called "Badge"). He is anthropomorphic - he has the ability to talk (with a South London accent) and wears smaller versions of human clothes (including his trademark red beret and red and white patterned neckerchief) and is obsessed with mashed potato, which he likes to play with as well as eat. Because he has a low, booming voice, his laugh sounds like that of the boxer Frank Bruno. He gets Simon into trouble much of the time by playing around with mashed potato because some of the characters do not know about Badger, so instead Simon gets the blame for Badger's mishaps. It is Badger's continual childlike inability to behave himself that gets him into trouble with Simon, with Simon having not only to take the blame for many of Badger's antics, but also to try and keep Badger's existence a secret. Nevertheless, Badger is still a very good friend to Simon and tries to help him out in every way he can, although Badger usually misunderstands a situation or can take things literally. Despite this, however, Badger still exhibits the natural instincts of a badger. For example, he will eat various items that he isn't supposed to in situations when it isn't helpful. On two occasions he has eaten smashed up cake at completely inappropriate times and on another he ate a biro pen when Bodger got one out to fill out a job application form. He can also run very fast (badgers can run up to 19 mph) and can frequently be heard scuttling away from any given situation or location. He has many catchphrases (mostly South Londoner and Cockney slang, although he never uses rhyming slang) including (but not limited to): shouting "MASHED POTATO" when he comes across his favourite food and using the word  "wotcha" when greeting someone. He will also use hippy slang when expressing admiration for something, using expressions such as "far out!", "cosmic!" and "groovy!". When expressing an emotion he frequently follows the word (sometimes slang expressions) for said emotion with "potatoes", e.g. "soppy potatoes" or "sad potatoes" and he is frequently heard singing the words "mashed potato" to the melody of football chant Here We Go, e.g. "Maaaaashed po-tay, mashed potay, mashed potay-ay-ay, mashed potay, mashed potay, mashed potayyyy-to".

It is not known for certain how Bodger originally met Badger although the opening titles for the first three series suggest that they met when Bodger was purchasing a ticket to make a journey on a London Underground train and Badger (when a fully grown adult Badger) stole the ticket, only to meet him again on the train. In this sequence, Bodger first expresses dismissal of the event only to look puzzled by what has just happened a moment later. A later episode (after those titles stopped being used), however, suggests that Simon Bodger started looking after Badger when he was a badger cub.

There were several different Badger puppets used throughout the series - all looked very similar bar their ear sizes and the width of the two stripes down Badger's face and snout. The distance between Badger's eyes also varied throughout the show's run and the beret on the series one Badger puppet wasn't very flexible. In all other series it had more flexibility so it could swing round as Badger moved and talked. Badger's clothes changed regularly, but this was designed as a feature of the puppets. The puppet's eyes themselves also changed - always googly eyes around two to three inches in diameter with pupils varying in size but around an inch in diameter. On some puppets the pupils could reach the bottoms of the eyes, in others, the pupils swing about in a "cradle" in the middle of the eyes.
Mousey (voiced and operated by Jane Bassett) - Mousey is an anthropomorphic talking mouse who lives under the floorboards of the flat that Bodger rents from Series 5–7. She and Badger are great friends, both constantly getting up to mischief. Mousey also has a favourite food it is apparent she is addicted to, namely cheese (although in real life mice aren't as fond of cheese as is commonly believed). Mousey's presence is only known by Bodger in the first episode of Series 5 when he sets traps to try to catch her. After Badger makes friends with Mousey, he deceives Simon into believing Mousey has gone from the house. When Bodger and Badger move to Puddleford to run their hotel in Series 8, Mousey moves with them and takes up residence in the airing cupboard rather than under the floorboards. Even though Badger is known to several of the human characters, Mousey is kept a secret from everyone, although Mrs Dribelle spots her on two occasions in Bodger's flat and Mrs Melly on one occasion when she tries to capture her while she is disguised as a rare bird (this being in order to fool Miss Piper, a birdwatcher staying at Bodger's hotel). Mousey appears to be a fan of royalty, especially in the episode "Mrs. Dribelle and The Queen" where she thinks she's going to live in Buckingham Palace with the Queen, unaware that it is actually Mrs. Dribelle in disguise. When Mousey speaks, it is clear Badger understands her perfectly, however in episode 1 of series 5 it is implied Bodger can only interpret her language as the normal squeaking of a field mouse or house mouse. Jane also appeared on-screen throughout series 5 to 7 as various different minor supporting characters before landing a regular character role in the programme in series 8 and 9 as Bodger's local milkwoman Millie. Mousey was a smaller character than Badger, but still needed her mouth and both front legs to move (although the puppet's mouth movements were limited). This limited the minimum size she could be made to, as only a hand would fit inside her and be able to operate all three things. The size of the puppet in comparison to a real mouse has no effect on the scenes she is in, however. A puppet of the bottom half of Mousey, made to the same scale was also made for occasions where Mousey's rear end was to be seen, although this was very rare. Like the other puppets in the programme, she has googly eyes. Although mice can run very fast in real life, the limitations of the puppet ( - or rather, puppets, the character being played by two glove puppets - one for each end) mean that she is often seen on screen struggling to move slowly across floors on all fours (moving fast running the risk of the operator's hand being seen), yet can move perfectly well when not on all fours (usually either under the floorboards, next to a surface such as a table or in her airing cupboard).

Series 1
Mr Hector Troff (Roger Walker) - The arrogant and tight-fisted owner of the restaurant in Series 1. He has no knowledge of Badger's presence (although he keeps glimpsing him but putting it down to his over-active imagination) until the final episode of the series. His character is based on that of Arkwright from Open All Hours - there are several similarities between the two characters, mainly a desire to improve their respective businesses while wanting to spend as little money as possible in doing so.
Mavis (Joanne Campbell) - An out-of-work singer who worked as a waitress at the restaurant with Bodger and was friendly with both Bodger and Badger. She returned, having made her fame and fortune in the singing profession, for one episode during Series 2 when she visited Bodger and Badger at Letsby Avenue Junior School.

Series 2 and 3
Mrs Daphne Trout (Lila Kaye) - The cruel and overweight Headmistress of Letsby Avenue Junior School, where Bodger worked in Series 2 and 3. She was referred to as 'Fish-face' by Badger and the school children. She enjoyed insulting Bodger and Miss Moon, being nasty to the children and going down the cake shop. She was sent back to Teacher Training College by Chairman of the School Board of Governors Mr Valentino after she tried to get Miss Moon sacked in the third series and also for being unable to read. It is revealed in the episode following her departure that she became the new Chair of the School Board of Governors. She appeared briefly in the final episode of Series 3 in a flashback to when she was still Headmistress, when she messed up the class photograph as her weight caused the bench to collapse.
Miss Geraldine Moon (Selina Cadell) - The warm-hearted but dim-witted Deputy Head of Letsby Avenue Junior School throughout Series 2 and 3. She was friendly with Bodger, but not enough for him to let her know about Badger. She was briefly the acting Headmistress after Mrs Trout was sent back to Teacher Training School, but returned to her old post when Mrs Bogart took over as Headmistress. As a teacher she was incompetent - she never made the children do any work and just let them play games all day when she was acting Headmistress. She repeatedly sees Badger, but soon passes it off as overwork or some other stress-related mental health issue when she experiences other things that can't be explained (usually caused by Badger).
Mr Valentino (Rudolph Walker) - Chairman of the School Board of Governors of Letsby Avenue Junior School, who appeared in two episodes in Series 3. He sends Mrs Trout away to retrain as a teacher after he realises she is an incompetent Headmistress.
Mrs Prunella Bogart (Richenda Carey) - The elegantly dressed, nasty-tempered Headmistress who replaced Mrs Trout in Series 3. She is Mrs Trout's sister and she brought along her spoiled nephew, Eamon, who wanted to replace Bodger as the school handyman. Like Mrs Trout, she is lazy and prefers to delegate as much of her work as possible to Miss Moon (who is frequently too kind and cowardly to stand up for herself), despite the fact that she is the Headmistress, and spends most of her time in her office eating chocolate, confiscating the children's chocolate, or at the chocolate shop. She is nicknamed 'Mrs Bogey' by Badger and is always looking for ways to make quick money. In many ways, she is similar personality-wise to her sister Mrs Trout.
Eamon Trout (Philip Herbert) - Mrs Trout's spoiled son, and therefore Mrs Bogart's nephew. He wanted Mrs Bogart to fire Bodger so he could be the school handyman, but he was quickly scared away by Badger and the children.

Series 4
Mr Lionel Beasley (Jon Glover) - Bodger's superior at Chessington World of Adventures in Series 4. He tries to imply he is an educated professional, and excellent at his job. He knows of Badger's presence at the park and is constantly trying to catch him, although he does not know he is Bodger's pet.
Holly (Sophie Worters) - A friendly girl who spends a lot of time at Chessington in Series 4. She is good friends with both Bodger and Badger and dislikes Mr Beasley just as much as they do.

Series 5, 6 and 7
"Boss" & Courtney (Penelope Nice and Ashley Artus) - Two villainous thieves who attempt to burgle Bodger's flat in Series 5. Posing as two council officers upgrading home security, they try to steal a valuable Ancient Egyptian statue which belongs to Bodger's aunt. They fail, thanks to Badger who tricks the dim-witted Courtney into believing that it is a cursed statue that throws 'Ancient Egyptian mashed potato' if tampered with.
Mrs Cecilia Dribelle (Carol MacReady) - The extravagantly dressed businesswoman from whom Bodger rents his flat in Series 6 and 7. She has a distinct dislike for animals (apart from cats) and forbids her tenants from keeping pets, resulting in Bodger having to constantly hide Badger whenever she visits. She dislikes Bodger intensely and tries everything she can think of to evict him, she also expressed a dislike for pop music in one episode. She is fond of cakes and biscuits, and likes to profit from silly ideas. She is nicknamed 'Mrs Dribble' and 'Dribbly Bibbly' by Badger. She drives around in a car which varied in different episodes with the registration plate 'DRIB 1' and has a cat called Fluffykins. In her early episodes she is made aware of Badger's presence by her sidekick, Elton, but never actually sees him as Elton's plans to catch Badger always fail. She eventually decides that Elton is imagining Badger. However, she has spotted Badger herself on several occasions - in one episode she saw Badger when she got knocked out, mistakenly thinking that Badger was her pet cat Fluffykins. Another was when Fluffykins had disappeared and Badger was inside the cat box pretending to be Fluffykins. Another time was when Badger was hiding behind a picture frame which Mrs Dribelle thought was a picture of a Badger. After spending the majority of Series 6 trying to find ways to evict Bodger, Mrs Dribelle later employs him as her handyman in Series 7. Later on she allowed her niece, Vicky, to stay in the first floor flat above Bodger's after she evicted Alec Smart. After Vicky left to go touring with a band, Mrs Dribelle temporarily moved into the vacant flat while her house was being decorated.
Elton (Joe Cushley) - Mrs Dribelle's dim-witted sidekick. He is a hardman who always wears a woolly hat with badges and a denim jacket. He knows that Bodger has a badger in the flat after Badger hits him on the head with a frying pan. He is incredibly stupid and is always trying to prove to Mrs Dribelle that there is a badger in the flat by all means possible, but he never succeeds. In one episode he dressed up as Mrs Dribelle's mother to trick Simon into believing Mrs Dribelle had nowhere to live, so that she could get Simon to move out of the flat. However Badger, who could see Elton's underpants underneath his skirt, knew it was Elton so he tried to show Simon the underpants. First he pulled the lever when Elton was sitting on the bed which made the bed go back, but it still did not work so Badger thought of another way to show Simon the underpants by turning the vacuum cleaner on, which sucked up the skirt Elton was wearing. Simon then saw the underpants and realised it was Elton. Even though Mrs Dribelle features in Series 7, Elton did not feature after Series 6. He was last seen in the episode 'Badger's Party' where he was attacked by children who were St John Badger Scouts.
 Daphne  (Jane Bassett) - A friend of Mrs Dribelle's, who appears in the Series 7 episode 'Cuckoo'. After Simon sells Mrs Dribelle an old Grandfather Clock (which is also a cuckoo clock) for £50, she tries to sell it to Daphne - who is an antiques dealer - for £500. At first Daphne does not believe her when she is told that is a "Grandfather Cuckoo Clock" - however when Mousey, disguised as a cuckoo, comes out of the clock and squirts mashed potato on Mrs Dribelle, Daphne starts to laugh at Mrs Dribelle, telling her that she is the one that's cuckoo if she thinks she's going to pay £500 for the clock. Mrs Dribelle gets angry and shoves a pie in her face - the two ladies then have a food fight.
Alec Smart (Ricky Diamond) - The sly and untrustworthy tenant who moves into the flat above Bodger's in Series 7. He was always thinking up schemes to make money, often tricking Mrs Dribelle and Bodger in the process. He sucks up to Mrs Dribelle while secretly trying to scam her. In the episode 'Mrs Dribelle's Big Day' he asks her to marry him, with the intention of getting his hands on her money. After Mrs Dribelle discovers his plan, she throws him out of the flat. A year later when Bodger and Badger move to Puddleford at the beginning of Series 8 to run a hotel, they are horrified to discover that Mr Smart is their next door neighbour once again. He is also running a hotel, but never seems to have any guests and is always trying to steal Bodger's or trying to outshine his rival in every despicable way possible. He was last seen in the episode 'Doggone' when he kidnapped China the dog in order to obtain a reward for finding him. As he is not seen or mentioned again in the series, it is assumed that he moved away from Puddleford or still lives next door but never mentioned.
Vicky (Sally Ann Marsh) - Mrs Dribelle's niece. She was supposed to have been an accountant, but Vicky had dreams of being part of a band. She moves into the upstairs flat in after Alec Smart is thrown out. She is supposed to work for her auntie, but she is always secretly auditioning for jobs as a drummer. She hides her drum kit in the bath when Mrs Dribelle visits as she disapproves of it. Vicky and Badger got on very well as they both love mashed potato. She ended up going on tour with a travelling band as a drummer. Vicky only appeared in Series 7.
Luigi - An Italian badger who travelled from Italy and stayed at Bodger and Badger's flat during Series 7 (the puppet design for this was very similar to Badger's). He had several arguments with Badger over which was the better food - spaghetti or mashed potato. At first Bodger did not know about Luigi's presence. After he found out about Luigi, Bodger allowed him to stay at the flat a while. Luigi only appeared in one episode. This meant use was made of the programme's requirement to have more than one Badger puppet at a time, should one get damaged in a stunt and be out of action for some time being repaired. A small blue trilby hat was wedged over the spare puppet's red beret and the clothes were changed (as all the Badger puppets were designed to be).

Series 8 and 9
Millie (Jane Bassett) - A milkwoman in Puddleford who is a friend of Bodger and Badger in Series 8 and 9. She helps out Bodger and Badger on numerous occasions, mainly allowing use of her milk float to carry customers around, such as picking Mr Wilson up from the station. She shares their dislike of Mr Smart and Mrs Melly. She owns a dog named China, who is friends with Badger.
China - A dog originally owned by the Hutchins family in Series 8 but later belongs to Millie in Series 9. It is unknown how he became Millie's pet or why he is no longer with the Hutchins. He worked with Badger and Mousey to cause chaos with mashed potato around Puddleford. He likes annoying Mrs Melly by barking loudly outside her office. Of the three puppets used in the series, China is the first that puppeteer Andy Cunningham got, claiming to have bought him at a magician's show in Brighton in the 1970s. He is a "Benji the Adorable Puppy" puppet, whom Andy christened "China" following Cockney rhyming slang ("China" being short for "china plate", meaning "mate"). However, of the three that were used on the series, China was the only one purchased ready-made - all versions of Badger and Mousey were made for Andy Cunningham by a personal friend of his. Before Bodger and Badger, Andy used China in children's party acts he used to perform in the London area, while another puppet he owned (also made for him by the same person who made the Badger and Mousey puppets), a foul-mouthed talking rat called Magritte (which never appeared in the series) would be used for entertaining at events where a more adult audience was in attendance. Again, China (and Magritte) used googly eyes.
Miss Prunella Peake (Valerie Minifie) - One of Bodger's first hotel guests in Series 8.  She was bad-tempered and miserable and was rather rude and quite threatening to Bodger. She also was nicknamed 'Old Peaky' by Badger. She leaves his hotel in disgust after finding mashed potato in her bed and is immediately pounced on by Mr Smart, who tries to seduce her into staying at his hotel instead. She soon sees through him, however, and returns to Bodger's hotel. She later becomes obsessed with the legend of the lost pirate treasure, and along with Mr Smart, ends up digging up half of Puddleford beach trying to find it. On her final day in Puddleford she enters a fancy dress competition with Bodger and wins thanks to Badger and Mousey.
Mr Tucknott (Bill Thomas) - A bank manager who stayed in Bodger's hotel in Series 8. He is quite cheerful but appears to be long-suffering and quite nervous about his job, and becomes particularly worried when trying to write a speech in the episode 'Mashy Record Breakers'.
Mrs Bobbins (Jo Warne) - Stayed in Bodger's hotel in Series 8 at the same time as Mr Tucknott. She is very bubbly and appears to like Bodger, but is not aware of Badger's presence, even in the episode 'Big Bear' when Badger poses as a large teddy bear which she bought for her granddaughter and she tries to wrap him up in wrapping paper.
Mrs Sharona Melly (Carole Boyd) - The bossy, bad-tempered Tourist Information officer from Series 9. She was also nicknamed 'Mrs Smelly' and 'Smelly Melly', due to her forename beginning with 'S', and appearing as 'Mrs S Melly'. She is highly suspicious of Bodger and believes that he is hiding something in his hotel, although she never actually finds out about Badger. She refuses to recommend Bodger's hotel to tourists because he accidentally covered her in mashed potato when she visited his B & B. She dislikes people having fun on the beach outside her office and will do anything to prevent it. She has a lot of trouble with China the dog, who is always hanging around her office. She often looks for quick ways to make money, such as when she attempts to catch a valuable bird and charge people to see it, and when she believes Bodger has won the lottery she buys him lunch and starts being nice to him in the hope that he will share some of his winnings with her.
Miss Piper (Hilda Braid) - A short-sighted birdwatcher who featured in only one episode. She stayed in Bodger's hotel in Series 9 while trying to spot a rare and valuable bird on the cliffs above Puddleford. However, she makes the mistake of telling Mrs Melly about it, who tries to catch it to make some quick money.
Mr Malcolm Wilson (Matthew Woolcott) - A trainee bank manager who stayed in Bodger's hotel in Series 9. Like most of the characters, he too despises mashed potato as he is involved in an unfortunately large number of incidents where he ends up covered in it. In one episode he even accidentally tasted it in his cereal. He is a bit of a cry-baby, who gets upset over the slightest things, one of the most notable being when he is late for a job interview after Mrs Melly confiscates his clothes while he is swimming in the sea.
Mr Bill Gripper (Roger Liddle) - Another hotel guest from two episodes in Series 9. A school P.E. teacher who had a crush on Mrs Melly and challenged Mr Wilson to a running race along the sea front, which he lost (thanks to Badger).

Crew
Andy Cunningham - Creator / Writer of most of the episodes.
Wayne Jackman - Other Writer
Jane Bassett - Other Writer of most of the episodes.
Pierre Hollins - Other Writer
Claire Winyard - Director (series 2)
Judy Whitfield - Executive Producer, Producer (series 1)
Greg Childs - Producer (series 2)
Christine Hewitt - Producer (series 5–8)
Sue Morgan - Producer (series 9)

Popularity

In 2000 and 2001 all episodes of Bodger and Badger were repeated on archive children's programming strand CBBC on Choice on the BBC Choice digital TV channel. Additionally, they were broadcast on CBeebies in 2002 but then disappeared from schedules until 2005 when the CBBC channel began a repeat of series 6–9. Since 2008 it has not been shown at all, although recorded episodes have surfaced on the internet and exist on YouTube.

Bodger and Badger has enjoyed something of a cult status, particularly among teenagers and young adults who grew up with the programme. It has also found popularity amongst students, tuning into daytime re-runs. As such, it has led to a popular tour of UK universities; 'Mashed Potato Theme Nights' were held at various universities, including Hull, Aston, Warwick, Bath, Buckinghamshire New and Aberystwyth. A DVD, 'Bodger and Badger: Live', was released on 6 November 2006.

Bodger and Badger have also since appeared in other venues, most notably in the kids' field at Glastonbury Festival, where a routine aimed primarily at children is also cleverly seeded with knowing in-jokes about the festival and the people attending it.

In 2007, two adverts were filmed for instant mashed potato brand Smash, the first in a planned series of adverts for a new marketing campaign featuring the two characters and playing on Badger's love of mashed potato. However, whilst the first two adverts were completed and shown at trade fairs, as well as some industry literature featuring the characters released, the ad campaign was ultimately dropped and never aired, due to the BBC still owning the rights to the Bodger and Badger name and concept, which would conflict with the BBC's obligation to not use any of its programmes or stars to promote commercial properties.

Andy Cunningham died of duodenal cancer on 5 June 2017, aged 67.

With approval from Cunningham's family, Badger is now puppeteered by Ash White. An official TikTok account for "Bodger's Badger" was set up in September 2022.

Series and episodes

Series One (1989)

Series 1 featured Bodger and Badger working in Troff's Nosherama, a run-down café with pretensions to being a restaurant. While Bodger worked in the kitchens as a chef, both he and Badger made friends with the waitress, Mavis. Troff's Nosherama was run by Mr Troff who was very arrogant, tight-fisted and stubborn. Troff had no idea of Badger's presence until the end of the last episode in the series.

It was not known during production whether another series was to be recommissioned, hence the last episode of this series is titled "The Final Episode".

The closing titles of this series at first featured specially-shot clips of the cast (in character) then a specially-shot clip of Badger over the technical crew credits. This changed gradually through the series, slowly incorporating repeated clips of cast members (in character) from earlier in the episode, although these were occasionally interspersed with the specially-shot clips, with the latter gradually being phased out. The specially-shot clip of Badger over the technical crew credits remained, however.

All transmission data is taken from the BBC Genome project.

This series was repeated on 8 consecutive Tuesdays from 13 February to 3 April 1990 on BBC1 at 3:50pm.

Series Two (1991)
Series 2 and 3 featured Bodger and Badger working at Letsby Avenue junior school; Simon worked as the caretaker, Badger made friends with the school children and crawled around the air vents - a method of transport he found most useful to keep hidden from the school's teaching staff. Letsby Avenue's headmistress in this series was the overweight and nasty Mrs Trout, there was also the friendly and ditsy deputy head Miss Moon.

This series was the first to be broadcast in NICAM stereo sound.

All transmission data is taken from the BBC Genome project.

This series was first repeated on Mondays from 6 to 27 April 1992 except the bank holiday 20 April. It then switched to Thursdays on 30 April and 7 May 1992. It then began Monday and Thursday repeats from Monday 11th to Thursday 21 May 1992, before moving again to three consecutive Mondays 1 to 15 June 1992. All except the final episode were repeated on BBC1 at 3:50pm. The final episode was repeated on BBC2 in the same timeslot, owing to sports coverage on BBC1. This was the first time Bodger and Badger had been broadcast on BBC2.

Series Three (1991)
Series 3 is still set in Letsby Avenue junior school, but Mrs Trout was fired halfway through the series and Miss Moon became the new temporary headmistress until Mrs Bogart (Mrs Trout's sister) took over as headmistress, when Mrs Trout became a school governor. Like the previous series, Badger's presence was knowledge to everyone in the school except the school teaching staff. From this series, the closing credits were edited down to contain only one verse of the theme song. This practice of edited down credits was to continue until the end of the series, with new surrounding graphics for series 9. The repeats of clips featuring characters for the actor credits continued, however, the specially-shot clip of Badger over the technical crew credits was gone, the number of credited technical crew roles having been dramatically reduced, so this portion of the end credits consisted entirely of random clips from earlier in the episode (in chronological order).

Transmission information is taken from the BBC Genome project.

The first ten episodes of this 12-episode series were repeated on consecutive Tuesdays from 6 April to 8 June 1993 at 4:05pm on BBC1. The repeat run was not completed owing to shortening of the afternoon CBBC strand in subsequent weeks for Wimbledon and other various sporting events and there being no available slots in the weeks after those.

Series Four (1993)
Series 4 featured Bodger and Badger working at Chessington World of Adventures, a theme park in Surrey. Bodger was the caretaker there, and Badger made friends with a girl called Holly who frequently visited the theme park. Owing to her mother being a staff member there, Holly was free to visit whenever she liked. Bodger's boss was Mr Beasley, who was nasty and obsessed with rules. Beasley kept trying to catch Badger to try to get Bodger chucked out.

Series 4's episodes were cut down to 10 minutes, instead of 15. This is the least-remembered series of all. It is the hardest to obtain copies of. This series was repeated on Mondays and Tuesdays, with an occasional gap of one week, from March to June 1996, commencing the week following the end of the original transmission of series 6. The opening titles to this series and the remaining series were edited short, so that by this point, the full verse of the theme song is not heard in both opening and closing titles (instead concentrating on one verse each). The opening titles now only contain clips from episodes in the series, with no material specially shot for the opening titles. The practice of having clips from earlier in the episode of actors appearing in character over their credits in the closing credits sequence was gone, with random clips from the episode appearing in chronological order throughout the closing credits sequence. This would remain the normal fashion of episode credits for the series until the end (with a surrounding graphics change for series 9).

All transmission data is taken from the BBC Genome project.

Series Five (1995)
Series 5 to 7 featured Bodger and Badger living in a rented bedsit flat (Exterior scenes were filmed at No. 78 Grove Avenue, Hanwell in London). This was the beginning of the show's most popular and best-remembered period, series 5–7. Badger met his new friend Mousey in Series 5, a mouse who lived under the floorboards. She became a permanent fixture of the programme from that point onwards. Just as Bodger tries to keep Badger's presence hidden from figures of authority, Badger in turn kept Mousey's presence a secret from Bodger, because Bodger tried to get rid of Mousey in the first episode of Series 5 by setting traps.

These episodes reverted to the 15-minute format.

All transmission data was obtained from the BBC Genome project.

From this series onwards, no repeat transmission data will be provided on this article, as the show's success beginning with this series meant that the show would be repeated much more regularly from this point onwards than it previously had been, leading to many more repeat dates for each individual episode.

Series Six (1996)
Bodger, Badger and Mousey are still living at the same flat as featured in series 5. This series mainly featured the pair having problems with their new landlady, Mrs Dribelle, and Elton her sidekick who did all her dirty work. Mrs Dribelle did not allow her tenants to keep animals in her properties, so Bodger always had to hide Badger whenever she came to the flat. In between the transmissions of series 6 and 7, on Friday 28 June 1996 on BBC2, the characters of Bodger and Badger were special guests in an episode of CBBC's gameshow "To Me, To You", presented by the Chuckle Brothers.

All transmission data was obtained from the BBC Genome project.

Series Seven (1996–1997)
Bodger, Badger and Mousey were still living in the same flat as in series 5 and 6. After series 6, though, series 7 returned to the format of more everyday adventures and various people moved into the flat upstairs, including a slimy trickster called Mr Smart and Mrs Dribelle's niece, Vicky. Mrs Dribelle herself lived in the upstairs flat temporarily while her house was renovated. Some of the sound effects used are shared from the Sonic the Hedgehog games. This was the longest-running series, running for six months with a clip show halfway through the series and another at the end.

During this series, on Friday 14 March 1997 (Comic Relief day 1997), Bodger and Badger were special guests in a special Comic Relief-themed episode of the CBBC game show "The Friday Zone", entitled "The Red Nose Zone".

All transmission data is taken from the BBC Genome project.

Series Eight (1997–1998)
Series 8 and 9 featured Bodger and Badger running a Bed & Breakfast hotel in the fictional seaside town of Puddleford (location filming for series 8 and 9 took place around Brighton). Various guests stayed at the hotel over the course of the two series and again Bodger kept Badger's presence a secret from all of them. Guests included two Spanish flamenco dancers, Miss Peake (a bad-tempered school teacher), Mr Tucknott (a dim-witted bank manager), the bubbly Mrs Bobbins, Miss Piper (a mad old woman) and Mr Wilson (a pathetic trainee bank manager). In Series 8 the characters of Millie the Milkwoman and China the dog were introduced, who featured in the show until the very end. Millie was friends with Bodger and knew about Badger, as he was friends with her dog, China. Series 8 also featured the return of Mr Smart, as he ran the B&B next door to Bodger's. Smart never seemed to have any guests staying at his hotel and was always trying to steal Bodger's. This was the first series to use the 1997 BBC branding and the last series to use the cream-coloured background for its title card and end credits.

All transmission data is taken from the BBC Genome project.

Series Nine (1998–1999)
Series 9 continued with the setting of series 8, with Bodger still running his hotel with Badger and (unwittingly) Mousey in tow. In this series the character of Mrs Melly (nicknamed Mrs Smelly by Badger and Mousey) was introduced, the bossy tourist information officer who stopped people from having fun on the beach outside her office. She hated Bodger and refused to recommend his B&B to tourists although she was kind to him in one episode - "Hundreds And Thousands". The opening titles changed this series and no longer featured the Bodger & Badger logo.

Andy Cunningham revealed in an interview for a book that Bodger and Badger ended its ten-year run in 1999 when the Head of BBC Children's Programmes - Christopher Pilkington (who had commissioned the show in 1989 and championed it since then) - left his post and the programme was not renewed by his successors - Andy said that he was not surprised by this, but he didn't reveal why. He mentioned that he didn't mind this anyway as he said he was struggling for inspiration for things to do with mashed potato towards the end of the show's run. Reference 

All transmission dates were obtained from the BBC Genome project.

References

External links
 Comedy Guide - Bodger and Badger at bbc.co.uk
 Bodger and Badger Episode Guide
 
 Bodger and Badger are back

BBC children's television shows
British television shows featuring puppetry
1989 British television series debuts
1999 British television series endings
1980s British children's television series
1990s British children's television series
Fictional badgers
CBeebies
Television series by BBC Studios
English-language television shows